The Fox River Trolley Museum is a railroad museum in South Elgin, Illinois. Incorporated in 1961 as R.E.L.I.C. (Railway Equipment Leasing and Investment Co.), it opened in 1966 and became the Fox River Trolley Museum in 1984.

Location
The museum is located at 365 South LaFox Street (Illinois Route 31), approximately two blocks south of the intersection of LaFox and State Streets.

Collection
The museum maintains a collection of 30 antique electric trolleys, railroad cars, and locomotives which range in construction dates from 1887 to 1959.  The majority of the museum collection is focused on railways and electric transit lines of the Chicago area.  One of the most exceptional cars in this collection is the wooden interurban (inter-city) Chicago Aurora and Elgin Railroad car #20, purchased directly from CA&E after that railroad discontinued passenger service.  Car #20 was constructed in 1902 and is the oldest electric interurban car operating in the United States.  The most recent collection acquisitions include the interurban electric railway car, Aurora, Elgin & Fox River Electric Co. #304, that was built for the Fox River Line in 1923, and ran in daily service between Elgin and Aurora until March 1935.  Between 1935 and 1954, it operated in Cleveland over the line best known as the Shaker Heights Rapid Transit.  The car was then sold, with three other ex-Fox River Line cars, to real estate entrepreneur Gerald E. Brookins, whose family operated Trolleyville USA, in Olmsted Township, Ohio, in suburban Cleveland, until 2002.  AE&FRE #304 made its first run over its original railroad on August 21, 2010, over 75 years after it last ran on the line.

Chicago area interurbans 

Aurora, Elgin and Fox River Electric Company (AE&FRE)
Chicago, Aurora, and Elgin Railroad (CA&E)
Chicago North Shore and Milwaukee Railroad (CNS&M)
Chicago South Shore and South Bend Railroad (CSS&SB)

AE&FRE #5, a 45-ton General Electric diesel, was the last locomotive to work on AE&FRV tracks. It was bought in 1945 to replace two electric locos, and hauled coal cars from the Illinois Central Railroad junction at Coleman to the State Hospital in Elgin until 1972.

AE&FRE #7 (C), a flat car, was built in 1927 by the CNS&M as #1504, a pioneering piggyback car.

AE&FRE #304 was a lightweight interurban car built by St. Louis Car Company in 1923. It was operated between Elgin and Aurora until passenger service was discontinued in 1935.

CA&E #11 was built by J. G. Brill Company in 1910 as an express car and was converted to a line car in 1947.

CA&E #20 was built by Niles Car Company in 1902. This wooden car is the oldest electric interurban car operating in the United States.

CA&E #316 and 317 were two of six cars built by Jewett Car Company in 1913.

CA&E #458 was one of 10 cars built by St Louis in 1945, some of the last interurban cars built in the U.S.

CSS&SB #7 and 14 were built by Pullman Company in 1925. #14 was rebuilt and lengthened during WWII.

CNS&M 715 was built by Cincinnati in 1926.

CNS&M #756 was built by Standard Steel Car Company in 1930.

Chicago Transit Authority and predecessors 

Chicago City Railway (CCRy)
Chicago Rapid Transit Company (CRT)
Chicago Surface Lines (CSL)
Chicago Transit Authority (CTA)

CCRy #L202 was built in the company shops in 1908. A small electric switcher for yard use, it was in service until 1958, when it was rebuilt and renumbered as S343. It was still in service in 1973.

CCRy #S304 was built in the company shops in 1908 as a flatcar with a crane.

CRT #4103 was built by Cincinnati Car Company in 1914 It is a “Baldy” with three doors per side. The last 4000-series cars were retired in 1973.

CRT #4288 and #4451 were built by Cincinnati in 1922 and 1924. These are the newer “Plushie” body style, without center doors.

CSL #6 was a street Railway Post Office built in 1891. This small single truck car is from the dawn of electric streetcars.

CTA 5001 was one of four three car articulated trainsets delivered from Pullman Company (5003 and 5004 by St. Louis Car Company) in 1948 to test PCC components for rapid transit cars. Because of their high speed and large capacity they were used on the Skokie Swift exclusively between 1964 and 1985, where they were renumbered 51–54.

CTA 6101-6102 were built by St Louis in 1950. They are a married set of cars which pioneered this arrangement, used on all future CTA cars, except the 1–50 series. These were the standard cars used from 1950 to 1975, the last were retired in 1992.

CTA #40, 43, and 45 were built by St Louis in 1959. These are essentially double ended, single car versions of the 6000 series cars. Most were taken out of regular service in 1993.

Other railroads 

San Francisco Municipal Railway #1030 was built by St Louis in 1953. One of the last pure PCC cars, this was the final development of the American streetcar.

Warren and Saline River Railroad #73 is a Whitcomb 70 ton locomotive built in 1948. Engines of this size are usually in short line or industrial service.

Soo Line #130 is a wooden caboose built in 1887. It is the oldest car at the museum.

Illinois Central Railroad #9648 was built at the company shops in 1957. It is a modern steel car which remained in service until the 1970s, when cabooses were phased out.

Heritage railroad
Since 2002, the museum has operated a heritage railroad over a 4-mile line along the banks of the scenic Fox River to the Jon J. Duerr (formerly Blackhawk) Forest Preserve. Visitors can board at the Castlemuir depot, on the museum grounds at the north end of the line in South Elgin, or at Blackhawk Station, at the south end of the line, adjacent to the picnic grove of the Jon J. Duerr Forest Preserve. Blackhawk Station is handicapped-accessible.

The museum's right-of-way was originally part of the Aurora, Elgin & Fox River Electric interurban railroad. The track leaves Castlemuir southbound and passes through Coleman, a former interchange with the Illinois Central Railroad. This is part of the last operating section of the interurban, closing in 1972. The track then continues south over a section closed in 1935 and then onto a new alignment that curves into the Forest Preserve.

The museum operates its trolley excursions from Mother's Day to the first Sunday in November every Sunday from 11:00 a.m. to 5:00 p.m.  During July and August, the museum excursions operate on Saturdays and Sundays from 11:00 a.m. to 5:00 p.m.

Non-profit organization
The Fox River Trolley Museum is operated by the Fox River Trolley Association (FRTA).  The FRTA is an educational, member-based 501(c)(3) tax exempt Illinois not-for-profit corporation.

Notes

References

External links

 
  Fox River Trolley... at  Eddie's Railfan Page

1966 establishments in Illinois
Heritage railroads in Illinois
Museums established in 1966
Museums in Kane County, Illinois
Railroad museums in Illinois
South Elgin, Illinois
Street railway museums in the United States